Laufen may refer to:

Laufen, Germany, a town in Upper Bavaria
Laufen, Switzerland, a town in Basel-Country
Laufen District, around the town in Switzerland

See also
 Lauffen am Neckar, a town in the Stuttgart Region of Germany
 Laufen Castle (disambiguation), multiple castles by this name